The Winnemucca Formation is a Triassic period geologic formation in northwestern Nevada, USA. It is found in the Sonoma Range in Humboldt County.

It preserves fossils dating back to the Triassic period of the Mesozoic Era.

See also

 List of fossiliferous stratigraphic units in Nevada
 Paleontology in Nevada

References

 

Triassic geology of Nevada
Geography of Humboldt County, Nevada
Geologic formations of Nevada
Triassic System of North America